Andrija Mutafelija (1883–1970) was a Croatian footballer and an important figure in the development of the game.

He was born in Slavonski Brod in 1883. As a member of the early Croatian football club PNIŠK, he was one of the first footballers in Zagreb. He played from 1903 to 1906. He co-founded HŠK Građanski Zagreb in a café on Preradović Square and was its first president from 1911 to 1914. He is credited with making the club competitive in the period directly after the First World War. By trade he was a hat salesman.

He died in Zagreb in 1970.

References

External links
Mutafelija, Andrija 

1883 births
1970 deaths
People from Slavonski Brod
Croatian footballers
Association footballers not categorized by position
Sportspeople from the Austro-Hungarian Empire